Brittney Ezell (born January 18, 1976) is a women’s college basketball coach, lastly as the head coach of the East Tennessee State Buccaneers women's basketball team. Ezell had previously been the coach of Montevallo University and Belmont University in Nashville, Tennessee.

Alabama statistics 
Source

Head coaching record

References 

1976 births
Living people
Alabama Crimson Tide women's basketball players
Basketball coaches from Tennessee
American women's basketball coaches
Belmont Bruins women's basketball coaches
East Tennessee State Buccaneers women's basketball coaches
Junior college women's basketball coaches in the United States